The following list includes notable people who were born or have lived in Aurora, Illinois. For a similar list organized alphabetically by last name, see the category page People from Aurora, Illinois.

Arts and culture

Acting and modeling

Directing

Fine arts

Journalism

Music

Writing and illustrating

Business and administrative

Crime

Military

Politics and law

Religion

Science

Sports

Baseball

Basketball

Football

Golf

Gymnastics

Sports-related professionals

Soccer

Track and field

References

Aurora
Aurora